Amanda Matthews (born 1968) is an American sculptor and painter from Louisville, Kentucky, United States, who lives in Lexington, Kentucky.

Early life, Education, and Family
Amanda Matthews was born in 1968 in Louisville, Kentucky to James (Jim) Matthews III and Brenda Matthews. She attended Bullitt East High School in Mt. Washington, Kentucky and graduated in 1986.  Matthews earned her Bachelor of Arts in Studio Art with a minor in Philosophy from the University of Louisville in Louisville, Kentucky.  She studied abroad in Paris, France in 1989 with the University of Louisville, studying Fine Art and Architecture while abroad.

Career
Matthews is known for her award-winning work that honors women and celebrates diversity and inclusion.  In 2019, she was selected to create a monumental sculptural installation titled, "The Girl Puzzle", in New York City on Roosevelt Island honoring investigative reporter Nellie Bly, which was planned to be unveiled in 2020, but due to the COVID-19 Pandemic, was completed and unveiled on December 10, 2021. 

On November 14, 2021 at Kentucky's COVID-19 Memorial Ceremony to mourn the over 10,000 Kentuckians who lost their life to the COVID-19 Pandemic, it was announced that Matthews design proposal "United We Stand, Divided We Fall" (based on the Kentucky State Motto) was chosen for the permanent Team KY COVID-19 Memorial Monument.

In 2018, her work honoring Alice Allison Dunnigan, the first African American female to receive White House and Congressional credentials, was unveiled at the Newseum in Washington, D.C. The statue of Alice Dunnigan traveled extensively  and was featured for programming at Kentucky State University, University of Kentucky, and the Truman Presidential Library. The bronze sculpture of Alice Dunnigan now permanently stands at the SEEK Museum in Russellville, KY, which was added to the United States civil rights trail in 2020.

Matthews began her career as a painter and faculty member for the Louisville Visual Arts Association.  She founded Wild Honeysuckle Studio in 1998, which merged with Prometheus Bronze Foundry, LLC in 2009.

Matthews received her first grant as part of the Sister Cities International program and travelled to Mainz, Germany in 2006 to represent the City of Louisville, Kentucky and the United States during the tenure of Mayor Jerry Abramson.  She participated in the Kunst in der Stadt, Kuenstlerarbeiten Public Exhibition at Gutenbergplatz, Mainz, Germany.  Fourteen artists, two artists each from seven countries, were selected to participate.  Her work while in Mainz was a permanent gift to the City of Mainz, Germany from the City of Louisville, KY. Later that year, she participated in the Kentuckians for the Commonwealth Appalachian Mountain Witness Tour for Artists and Writers in the fall of 2006, which marked the beginning of her decades-long body of large scale bronze Dryads, titled Messengers. In 2007, on Earth Day, she completed a 210' long Ephemeral Environmental Sculpture Installation, called Water is Life for the Louisville Zoo, an AZA and AAM Museum, with the help of 20 volunteers.  Diane Heilenman, Visual Arts Critic for the Courier Journal stated, "The work, 'Water is Life,' fits the context of all her sculptures and paintings, which are often about environmental issues."

In 2015, she founded the Artemis Initiative, an IRS approved 501(c)(3) Public Charity.

Matthews is Nettie Depp’s great-great niece, and a bronze statue of Nettie created by Matthews was approved for display in the Kentucky Capitol.  It is the first permanent large-scale monument of a woman inside that state capitol. While Nettie's influence was not statewide, the Historic Properties Advisory Commission considered her a representative example of Kentucky women who achieved professional and personal success. The statue’s unveiling occurred in November 2022.

Selected public works and collections
 2021-Current: Team Kentucky COVID-19 Memorial Monument, "United We Stand, Divided We Fall"  for KY Capitol Monuments Collection
 2014-2022: Life Size Bronze Portrait of Nettie Depp, public education champion from Kentucky, for KY State Capitol Building for KY Capitol Monuments Collection
 2019-2021:  Monumental Sculptural Installation honoring Investigative Journalist, Nellie Bly, New York City, Roosevelt Island, titled "The Girl Puzzle" at Lighthouse Park,; Collection: New York City Public Art Collection
2020-2021: Giant Ginseng Shade Sculpture for Legacy Grove Park, Collection: Greater Clark Foundation
2016–2019:  Life Size Bronze Portrait of Alice Allison Dunnigan for Russellville, Kentucky Collection: SEEK Museum (part of US Civil Rights Trail)
 2018-2019: 3D Letters and Plaques for "John Lewis - Good Trouble" Tribute Wall at Hartsfield-Jackson Atlanta International Airport, part of a team of artists that collaborated on the construction of the installation; Collection: Hartsfield-Jackson Atlanta Airport Collection
2015–2016: Life Size Bronze Portrait of Capt. Solomon Lee Van Meter Jr., pioneer aviator whose backpack parachute invention is featured in the Smithsonian National Air & Space Museum, Washington, D.C., for the Aviation Museum of Kentucky and Bluegrass Airport Permanent Collection
 2014: Life Size Ancient Greek Boxer Olympian Bronze Reproduction, Jasmine Hill Gardens, a Public Botanical & Sculpture Garden & Museum, Montgomery, Alabama, Jasmine Hill Gardens Permanent Collection
 2013: Bronze portrait of Dr. George Zach, retired conductor of Lexington Philharmonic installed in Singletary Center for the Arts, University of Kentucky Art Museum Permanent Collection
 2012: Good Shepherd Catholic Church Baptismal Font, Frankfort, KY, Roman Catholic Diocese of Lexington Permanent Public Collection
 2010: Life Size Bronze Stephen Elrod Memorial Sculpture installed at Georgetown College in Permanent Public Sculpture Collection
 2009: St. Paul Catholic Church Baptismal Font, Lexington, KY, Roman Catholic Diocese of Lexington Permanent Public Collection
 2007: Louisville Zoo, an AZA and AAM Museum, 210' Ephemeral Environmental Sculpture Installation, Water is Life
 2006: City of Mainz, Germany Permanent Collection

Nominations and Awards 

 2023 - Awarded 2022 Governor's Award in the Arts, Artist Award 
 2022 - Elected Chair of the Kentucky Oral History Commission
 2022 - Elected Vice Chair of the Kentucky Oral History Commission
 2021 - Small Business Association (SBA) Pacesetter Award; awarded to Amanda Matthews, Prometheus Art for The Girl Puzzle Monument
 2020 - Appointed as member of the Kentucky Oral History Commission by Governor Andy Beshear 
 2019 - Board/Committee Member, Monumental Women of Kentucky
 2018 - NAWBO (National Association of Women Business Owners) Kentucky Chapter awards Matthews 2018 "Strive Business Owner of the Year" Award 
 2018 - National Association of Women in Construction (Lexington Bluegrass Chapter 367) Bluegrass Diamond Award

Public mentions and media
 2022 - CNN: Kentucky unveils statue of Nettie Depp, the first woman to have a permanent large-scale monument inside the state Capitol
 2022 - LEX18 News: Nettie Depp statue unveiled at the Kentucky State Capitol
 2021 - Office of NY Governor: Governor Hochul Announces Opening of the Girl Puzzle Monument Honoring Nellie Bly
2021 - NBC News Now: How Roosevelt Island sculptures amplify stories of strong women 
2021 - CBS Saturday Morning News: Monument honoring journalist Nellie Bly opens: "This installation is spiritual" 
2021 - Office of KY Governor: Kentucky Artist Amanda Matthews to construct permanent Team Kentucky COVID-19 Memorial
2021 - Lexington Herald Leader: 'Not just a number.' Kentucky art installation will honor 10,000-plus COVID-19 deaths
2021 - The Courier-Journal: 20 Months, more than 10,000 deaths: Kentucky memorializes those who have died from COVID 
2021 - The Lily (Washington Post): This Massive Monument to Women is Quietly Taking Shape in New York City
2020 - New York Times: Placing Women on a Different Sort of Pedestal 
2020 - Smithsonian Magazine: Kentucky State Capitol Will Unveil Its First Statue Honoring a Woman 
2020 - Smithsonian Magazine:  The Must-See Outdoor Art Installations of 2020 Amanda Matthews' The Girl Puzzle, New York City, listed 3rd on worldwide list of 9
 2019 - C-SPAN:  African American Journalist Alice Allison Dunnigan Harry S. Truman Presidential Library and Museum, Dr. Nancy Dawson, Amanda Matthews, Soraya Dunnigan presented
2019 - Winchester Sun: Shade Sculpture will soon 'grow' at Legacy Grove 
 2018 - Politics:  First black female White House reporter gets Newseum statue, The Washington Post
 2018 - NATIONAL:  Alice Dunnigan, First Black Woman To Cover White House, Gets Statue At Newseum, NPR, All Things Considered
 2018 - Alice Dunnigan, First Black Woman to Cover White House, Will Get Statue at Newseum, The New York Times
2017 - Kentucky Historic Properties Advisory Commission approves life-size sculpture of Nettie Depp for Kentucky Capitol
 2016 – Dunnigan to be honored with bronze statue
 2016 – Aviation Museum to unveil bronze sculpture of aviation pioneer Van Meter
 2015 – Lexington sculptor seeks – and starts creating – more statues of notable Kentucky women, minorities, Lexington Herald Leader, Lexington, KY
 2015 – Appeared in Documentary Film, Dreamers and Doers: VOICES of Kentucky Women
 2015 – Restored Gratz Park 'kids' return to James Lane Allen fountain
 2013 – Dr. George Zach bronze portrait unveiled at Singletary Center for the Arts, in Lexington, KY, University of Kentucky Art Museum Permanent Collection
 2010 – Stephen Elrod Memorial bronze sculpture unveiled at Georgetown College
 April 22, 2007 – Water is Life Ephemeral Environmental Art Installation at the Louisville Zoo, Courier Journal, Critics Pick by Diane Heilenman, visual art critic
 July 2006 – Amanda Matthews (Fields) work featured in Germany's Der Mainzer Magazine
 May 2006 – Art World News magazine lists Amanda Matthews (Fields) on their Artists Worth Watching list.

See also
 List of sculptors
 List of female sculptors
 List of contemporary artists
 List of American artists 1900 and after
 List of 20th-century women artists
 List of people from Kentucky

References

External links
 Official web site

1968 births
Living people
20th-century American painters
20th-century American sculptors
Painters from Kentucky
Sculptors from Kentucky
University of Louisville alumni
Artists from Louisville, Kentucky
Artists from Lexington, Kentucky
Kentucky women artists
20th-century American women artists
21st-century American painters
21st-century American sculptors
21st-century American women artists